The 2017 Wimbledon Championships was a Grand Slam tennis tournament that took place at the All England Lawn Tennis and Croquet Club in Wimbledon, London, United Kingdom. The main draw matches commenced on 3 July 2017 and concluded on 16 July 2017. Roger Federer won the gentlemen's singles title for a record eighth time, surpassing Pete Sampras and William Renshaw, who both won the gentlemen's singles title seven times. Garbiñe Muguruza won the ladies' singles title.

The 2017 tournament was the 131st edition of the championships, the 50th in the Open Era and the third Grand Slam tournament of the year. It is played on grass courts, organised by the All England Lawn Tennis Club and the International Tennis Federation and is part of the ATP World Tour, the WTA Tour, the ITF Junior tour and the NEC Tour.

Andy Murray was the defending champion in the Gentlemen's singles but lost to Sam Querrey in the quarterfinals. Two-time defending Ladies' singles champion Serena Williams did not defend her title, as she ended her season in April due to pregnancy.

Tournament 

The 2017 Wimbledon Championships was the 131st edition of the tournament and was held at the All England Lawn Tennis and Croquet Club in London.

The tournament was run by the International Tennis Federation (ITF) and was included in the 2017 ATP World Tour and the 2017 WTA Tour calendars under the Grand Slam category. The tournament consisted of men's (singles and doubles), women's (singles and doubles), mixed doubles, boys (under 18 – singles and doubles) and girls (under 18 – singles and doubles), which is also a part of the Grade A category of tournaments for under 18, and singles and doubles events for men's and women's wheelchair tennis players as part of the UNIQLO Tour under the Grand Slam category. The tournament was played only on grass courts; main draw matches were played at the All England Lawn Tennis and Croquet Club, Wimbledon; qualifying matches were played at the Bank of England Sports Ground, in Roehampton.

Point and prize money distribution

Point distribution 
Below are the tables with the point distribution for each discipline of the tournament.

Senior points

Wheelchair points

Junior points

Prize money 
The Wimbledon total prize money for 2017 has been increased to £31.6m. The winners of the men's and women's singles titles will earn £2.2m. Prize money for the men's and women's doubles and wheelchair players were also increased for the 2017 competition.

* per team

Day-by-day summaries

Doubles seeds

Gentlemen's doubles 

1 Rankings were as of 26 June 2017.

Ladies' doubles 

1 Rankings were as of 26 June 2017.

Mixed doubles 

1 Rankings were as of 3 July 2017.

Champions

Seniors

Gentlemen's singles 

  Roger Federer def.   Marin Čilić, 6–3, 6–1, 6–4

Ladies' singles 

  Garbiñe Muguruza def.  Venus Williams, 7–5, 6–0

Gentlemen's doubles 

  Łukasz Kubot /  Marcelo Melo def.  Oliver Marach /  Mate Pavić, 5–7, 7–5, 7–6(7–2), 3–6, 13–11

Ladies' doubles 

  Ekaterina Makarova /  Elena Vesnina def.  Chan Hao-ching /  Monica Niculescu, 6–0, 6–0

Mixed doubles 

  Jamie Murray /  Martina Hingis def.  Henri Kontinen /  Heather Watson, 6–4, 6–4

Juniors

Boys' singles 

  Alejandro Davidovich Fokina def.  Axel Geller, 7–6(7–2), 6–3

Girls' singles 

  Claire Liu def.  Ann Li, 6–2, 5–7, 6–2

Boys' doubles 

  Axel Geller /  Hsu Yu-hsiou def.  Jurij Rodionov /  Michael Vrbenský, 6–4, 6–4

Girls' doubles 

  Olga Danilović /  Kaja Juvan def.  Caty McNally /  Whitney Osuigwe, 6–4, 6–3

Invitation

Gentlemen's invitation doubles 

  Lleyton Hewitt /  Mark Philippoussis def.  Justin Gimelstob /  Ross Hutchins, 6–3, 6–3

Ladies' invitation doubles 

  Cara Black /  Martina Navratilova def.  Arantxa Sánchez Vicario /  Selima Sfar, 6–2, 4–6, [10–4]

Senior gentlemen's invitation doubles 

  Jacco Eltingh /  Paul Haarhuis def.  Richard Krajicek /  Mark Petchey, 4−6, 6−3, [10−6]

Wheelchair events

Wheelchair gentlemen's singles 

  Stefan Olsson def.  Gustavo Fernández, 7−5, 3−6, 7−5

Wheelchair ladies' singles 

  Diede de Groot def.  Sabine Ellerbrock, 6–0, 6–4

Wheelchair gentlemen's doubles 

  Alfie Hewett /  Gordon Reid def.  Stéphane Houdet /  Nicolas Peifer, 6–7(5–7), 7–5, 7–6(7–3)

Wheelchair ladies' doubles 

  Yui Kamiji /  Jordanne Whiley def.  Marjolein Buis /  Diede de Groot, 2–6, 6–3, 6–0

Main draw wild card entries 
The following players received wild cards into the main draw senior events.

Gentlemen's doubles 
 Jay Clarke  /  Marcus Willis
 Scott Clayton /  Jonny O'Mara
 Brydan Klein /  Joe Salisbury
 Thanasi Kokkinakis /  Jordan Thompson
 Ken Skupski  /  Neal Skupski

Ladies' doubles 
 Katie Boulter  /  Katie Swan
 Harriet Dart  /  Katy Dunne
 Jocelyn Rae  /  Laura Robson

Mixed doubles 
 Liam Broady /  Naomi Broady
 Dominic Inglot /  Laura Robson
 Joe Salisbury /  Katy Dunne
 Ken Skupski /  Jocelyn Rae
 Neal Skupski /  Anna Smith

Main draw qualifier entries 
The qualifying competitions take place in Bank of England Sports Centre, Roehampton started from 26 June 2017 and to be scheduled to end on 29 June 2017. However, due to heavy rain on the second day, it has now extended to 30 June 2017.

Gentlemen's doubles 

Gentlemen's Doubles Qualifiers
  Johan Brunström /  Andreas Siljeström
  Kevin Krawietz /  Igor Zelenay
  Hugo Nys /  Antonio Šančić
  Hsieh Cheng-peng /  Max Schnur

Lucky losers
  Sander Arends /  Peng Hsien-yin
  Ariel Behar /  Aliaksandr Bury
  Dino Marcan /  Tristan-Samuel Weissborn
  Ilija Bozoljac /  Flavio Cipolla

Ladies' doubles 

Ladies' Doubles Qualifiers
  Natela Dzalamidze /  Veronika Kudermetova
  Paula Kania /  Nina Stojanović
  Monique Adamczak /  Storm Sanders
  İpek Soylu /  Varatchaya Wongteanchai

Lucky losers
  Lesley Kerkhove /  Lidziya Marozava
  Jessica Moore /  Akiko Omae
  Ashley Weinhold /  Caitlin Whoriskey

References

External links